Benzi is a surname. Notable people with the surname include:

Erick Benzi (born 1959), French music composer
Massimiliano Soldani Benzi (1656–1740), Italian sculptor
Oreste Benzi (1925–2007), Italian Roman Catholic priest
Roberto Benzi (born 1937), French music conductor